Yurina Imai (born 20 February 1998) is a Japanese professional footballer who plays as a midfielder for WE League club JEF United Chiba Ladies.

Club career 
Imai made her WE League debut on 20 September 2021.

References 

WE League players
Living people
1998 births
Japanese women's footballers
Women's association football midfielders
Association football people from Tokyo
JEF United Chiba Ladies players